Hot Rod Gang is a 1958 drama film directed by Lew Landers and starring John Ashley.  The working title was Hot Rod Rock with the film also released under the title Fury Unleashed. American International Pictures released the film as a double feature with High School Hellcats. The production includes performances by rock and roll musician Gene Vincent, and was the final theatrical feature directed by the incredibly prolific Landers, whose career dated to the mid-1930s.

Plot
John Abernathy III needs to lead a blameless life to inherit his father's estate, but he also engages in hot rod car racing.

Cast
 John Ashley as John Abernathy III
 Jody Fair as Lois Cavendish
 Steve Drexel as Mark 
 Scott Peters as Jack 
 Helen Spring as Abigail Abernathy
 Lester Dorr as Dryden Philpott
 Doodles Weaver as Wesley Cavendish
 Dub Taylor as Al Berrywhiff
 Gloria Grant as Tammy
 Maureen Arthur as Marley
 Dorothy Neumann as Anastasia Abernathy (as Dorothy Newman)
 Russ Bender as Motorcycle cop
 Claire Du Brey as Agatha

Production
The film was known during production as Hot Rod Rock.

Soundtrack
 "Hit and Run Lover", performed by John Ashley
 "Annie Laurie", performed by John Ashley
 "Dance in the Street", performed by Gene Vincent and The Blue Caps
 "Baby Blue", performed by Gene Vincent and The Blue Caps
 "Lovely Loretta", performed by Gene Vincent
 "Dance to the Bop", performed by Gene Vincent
 "Choo Choo Cha Poochie", performed by Maureen Arthur

Reception
The Los Angeles Times called it "a film of juvenile violence."

The Monthly Film Bulletin said "the comedy misfires woefully, the performances are overstated to the point of caricature and the general level is decidedly moronic."

Diabolique magazine wrote that "Ashley's limitations are exposed a little in this film – I don’t think he was a great comic actor – but it is entertaining and good-hearted."

See also
 List of American films of 1958

References

External links

Review of film at Variety

Review of film at Harrison Reports

1958 films
Films directed by Lew Landers
1958 drama films
American International Pictures films
American drama films
American auto racing films
Films scored by Ronald Stein
1950s English-language films
1950s American films